Karl Wilhelm August Reifferscheid (3 October 1835 – 10 November 1887) was a German archaeologist and classical philologist.

Biography
He was born and educated in Bonn. He received a traveling fellowship in archaeology from the University of Bonn, and spent 1861–66 mostly in Italy, part of the time fulfilling a request by the Vienna Academy to do archival research for the Corpus Scriptorum Ecclesiasticorum Latinorum. He was professor at Breslau (1868–85), and beginning in 1885, a professor at the University of Strassburg (Kaiser-Wilhelm-Universität).

Reifferscheid died in Strassburg, Alsace-Lorraine.

Works
His works include:
 Suetoni præter Cæsarum Libros Reliquiæ (1860); the standard edition of these fragments.
 Bibliotheca Patrum Latinorum Italica (2 volumes, 1865–72).
 Arnobii Adversvs nationes libri VII (1875); main author, Arnobius.
 An edition of Anna Comnena's Alexiad (1878).
 A partial edition of Tertullian, Quinti Septimi Florentis Tertulliani (edited by Georg Wissowa, 1890).

References
 

1835 births
1887 deaths
German classical philologists
Archaeologists from North Rhine-Westphalia
People from Bonn
University of Bonn alumni
Academic staff of the University of Breslau
Academic staff of the University of Strasbourg